Cupola House may refer to:

 Cupola House, Bury St Edmunds, England
 Cupola House (Edenton, North Carolina), listed on the NRHP in North Carolina
 Cupola House (Egg Harbor, Wisconsin), listed on the NRHP in Wisconsin